The Portsmouth Centenary Tournament was an invitational football tournament to celebrate the centenary of Portsmouth FC at Fratton Park, Portsmouth. The only edition took place between 1 and 2 August 1998. It was contested by four teams.

Tournament 
Source:

Bracket 

Genoa beat Portsmouth 8–7 on penalties.

Sochaux beat Wimbledon 4–3 on penalties.

Results

References

English football friendly trophies
Defunct football cup competitions in England
Sport in Portsmouth
Football in Hampshire

1998–99 in English football
1998–99 in Italian football
1998–99 in French football

1998 establishments in England
Portsmouth F.C.